Raymond Alexander Turnbull (August 29, 1880 – August 13, 1939) was an American football player and coach and physician. He served as player/coach at University of Buffalo for one season in 1903, compiling a record of 4–4.

Turnbull was born on August 29, 1880, in Elmira, New York, to William P. and Jenny E. Turnbull. He was educated in public schools of Elmira and Ithaca, New York. Turnbull attended Cornell University, where he played college football as an end in 1901. He earned a medical degree from the University of Buffalo in 1904 and practiced medicine in Elmira.

Turnbull served in the United States Army during World War I as a major and chief surgeon of the 107th Infantry Regiment in France. He died on August 13, 1939, in Elmira, after being hospitalized for a heart ailment.

Head coaching record

References

External links
 

1880 births
1939 deaths
American football ends
Player-coaches
Buffalo Bulls football coaches
Buffalo Bulls football players
Cornell Big Red football players
United States Army Medical Corps officers
University at Buffalo alumni
Sportspeople from Elmira, New York
Sportspeople from Ithaca, New York
Coaches of American football from New York (state)
Players of American football from New York (state)
Military personnel from New York (state)
Physicians from New York (state)